Benedict Biscop (pronounced "bishop";  – 690), also known as Biscop Baducing, was an Anglo-Saxon abbot and founder of Monkwearmouth-Jarrow Priory (where he also founded the famous library) and was considered a saint after his death.

Life

Early career
Benedict, born of a noble Northumbrian family, was for a time a thegn of King Oswiu of Bernicia At the age of 25 ( 653) Benedict made the first of his five trips to Rome, accompanying his friend Saint Wilfrid the Elder. However Wilfrid was detained in Lyon en route. Benedict completed the journey on his own, and when he returned to England was "full of fervour and enthusiasm ... for the good of the English Church".

Benedict made a second journey to Rome twelve years later. Alchfrith of Deira, a son of King Oswiu, intended to accompany him, but the king refused to grant permission. On this trip Biscop met Acca and Wilfrid. On his return journey to England Benedict stopped at  Lérins, a monastic island off the Mediterranean coast of Provence, which had by then adopted the Rule of St. Benedict. During his two-year stay there, from 665 to 667, he underwent a course of instruction, taking monastic vows and the name of "Benedict".

Following the two years in Lérins Benedict made his third trip to Rome. At this time Pope Vitalian commissioned him to accompany Archbishop Theodore of Tarsus back to Canterbury in 669. On their return Archbishop Theodore appointed Benedict as abbot of SS. Peter and Paul's, Canterbury, a role he held for two years.

Bibliophile
Benedict Biscop, the Bibliophile, assembled a library from his travels. His second trip to Rome had been a book-buying trip.  Overall, the collection had an estimated 250 titles of mostly service books. The library included scripture, classical, and secular works.

Founder

Ecgfrith of Northumbria granted Benedict land in 674 for the purpose of building a monastery. He went to the Continent to bring back masons who could build a monastery in the Pre-Romanesque style. Benedict made his fifth and final trip to Rome in 679 to bring back books for a library, saintly relics, stonemasons, glaziers, and a grant from Pope Agatho granting his monastery certain privileges. Benedict made five overseas voyages in all to stock the library.

In 682 Benedict appointed Eosterwine as his coadjutor and the King was so delighted at the success of St Peter's, he gave him land in Jarrow and urged him to build a second monastery. Benedict erected a sister foundation (St Paul) at Jarrow. He appointed Ceolfrid as the superior, who left Wearmouth with 20 monks to start the foundation in Jarrow. Bede, one of Benedict's pupils, tells us that he brought builders and glass-workers from Francia to erect the buildings in stone. 

He drew up a rule for his community, based on that of Benedict and the customs of seventeen monasteries he had visited. He also engaged Abbot John, Arch-cantor of St. Peter's in Rome, to teach Roman chant at these monasteries.

In 685, Ecgfrith granted the land south of the River Wear to Biscop. Separated from the monastery, this would be known as the "sundered land," which in time would become the name of the wider urban area.

Benedict's idea was to build a model monastery for England, sharing his knowledge of the experience of the Church in Europe. It was the first ecclesiastical building in Britain to be built in stone, and the use of glass was a novelty for many in 7th-century England. It eventually possessed what was a large library for the time – several hundred volumes – and it was here that Benedict's student Bede wrote his famous works. The library became world-famous and manuscripts that had been copied there became prized possessions throughout Europe, including especially the Codex Amiatinus, the earliest surviving manuscript of the complete Bible in the Latin Vulgate version.

Death
For the last three years of his life Benedict was bed-ridden. He suffered his affliction with great patience and faith. He died on 12 January 690.

Veneration
A sermon of Bede (Homily 17) indicates that there was a very early public cult of Biscop; for his feast, but it became more widespread only after the translation of his relics to Thorney under Ethelwold c.980. He is recognised as a saint by the Christian Church, which holds his feast day on 12 January.

Benedict is remembered in the Church of England with a commemoration on 12 January.

See also
 Saint Benedict Biscop, patron saint archive

Notes

Sources

Wikisource:Ecclesiastical History of the English People/Book 4#18
Wikisource:Ecclesiastical History of the English People/Book 5#19
Wikisource:Ecclesiastical History of the English People/Book 5#21
HAbb Bede, Lives of the Abbots of Wearmouth and Jarrow
Attwater, Donald and Catherine Rachel John. The Penguin Dictionary of Saints. 3rd edition. New York: Penguin Books, 1993. .
Bede's World guidebook, 2004
AVCeol: Anonymous, "Life of Abbot Ceolfrith" in Webb & Farmer (eds), The Age of Bede. London: Penguin, 1983. 
Blair, Peter Hunter, The World of Bede. Cambridge: Cambridge University Press, 1970. .
Benedict Biscop at Catholic Forum

External links
 

628 births
690 deaths
Abbots of St Augustine's
Abbots of Wearmouth
Northumbrian saints
Anglo-Saxon Benedictines
Benedictine abbots
Benedictine scholars
Benedictine saints
Anglo-Saxon saints
English chroniclers
People from Northumberland
7th-century Christian saints
Burials at Monkwearmouth-Jarrow Abbey
Anglican saints